The 1976–77 Toronto Maple Leafs season was the franchise's 60th season, 50th as the Maple Leafs. The Leafs finished in third place in the Adams Division with a record of 33 wins, 32 losses and 15 ties for 81 points. In the playoffs, they defeated the Pittsburgh Penguins in the preliminary round 2–1 before falling to the Philadelphia Flyers in six games in the Quarter-finals.

Regular season
On February 2, 1977, Toronto Maple Leafs defenceman Ian Turnbull would be the first player in NHL history to score five goals on five shots.

Season standings

Schedule and results

Player statistics

Regular season
Scoring

Goaltending

Playoffs
Scoring

Goaltending

Transactions
The Maple Leafs have been involved in the following transactions during the 1976–77 season.

Trades

Free agents

Awards and records
Lanny McDonald, Right Wing, NHL Second All-Star Team
Borje Salming, Defence, NHL First All-Star Team

Draft picks
Toronto's draft picks at the 1976 NHL Amateur Draft held in Montreal, Quebec.

References

Toronto Maple Leafs seasons
Toronto Maple Leafs season, 1976-77
Toronto